The Dwarkadhish temple, also known as the Jagat Mandir and occasionally spelled Dwarakadheesh, is a Hindu temple dedicated to Krishna, who is worshiped here by the name Dwarkadhish, or 'King of Dwarka'. The temple is located at Dwarka city of Gujarat, India, which is one of the destinations of Char Dham, a Hindu pilgrimage circuit. The main shrine of the five-storied building, supported by 72 pillars, is known as Jagat Mandir or Nija Mandir. Archaeological findings suggest the original temple was built in 200 BCE at the earliest. The temple was rebuilt and  enlarged in the 15th-16th century.

According to tradition, the original temple was believed to have been built by Krishna's grandson, Vajranabha, over the hari-griha (Krishna's residential place).  The original structure was destroyed by Mahmud Begada in 1472, and subsequently rebuilt in the 15th-16th century, in the Māru-Gurjara style. 

The temple became part of the Char Dham pilgrimage considered sacred by Hindus in India. Adi Shankaracharya, the 8th century Hindu theologian and philosopher, visited the shrine. The other three being comprising Rameswaram, Badrinath and Puri. Even today a memorial within the temple is dedicated to his visit. Dwarakadheesh is the 98th Divya Desam of Vishnu on the subcontinent, glorified in the Divya Prabandha sacred texts. It faces west. The temple layout consists of a garbhagriha (Nijamandira or Harigraha) and an antarala (an antechamber). However, the existing temple is dated to 16th century.

Legend
As per Hindu legend, Dwarka was built on a piece of land by Krishna that was reclaimed from the sea. Sage Durvasa once visited Krishna and his wife Rukmini. The sage wished that the pair took him to their palace. The pair readily agreed and started walking with the sage to their palace. After some distance, Rukmini got tired and she requested some water from Krishna. Krishna dug a mythical hole that brought in river Ganga to the place. Sage Durvasa was furious and cursed Rukmini to remain in the place. The temple where Rukmini's shrine is found, is believed to be the place where she stood.

History

The town of Dwarka in Gujarat has a history that dates back centuries, and mentioned in the Mahabharata epic as the Dwaraka Kingdom. Situated on the banks of river Gomti, the town is described in legend as the capital of Krishna.  Evidence such as a stone block with script, the way the stones were dressed showing that dowels had been used, and an examination of anchors found on the site suggest that the harbour site dates only to historical times, with some of the underwater structure being late Medieval. Coastal erosion was probably the cause of the destruction of what was an ancient port.

Hindus believe that the original temple was constructed by Vajranabh, the great grand son of Krishna, over the residential palace of Krishna. It was destroyed by Sultan Mahmud Begada in 1472.

The current temple in Chaulukya style was constructed in 15-16th century. The temple covers area of 27-metre by 21-metre with east–west length of 29-metre and north–south width of 23 metres. The tallest peak of the temple is 51.8 m high.

Religious importance

Since this site is associated with the ancient city of Dvārakā and the Vedic era Krishna of Mahabharata, it is an important place of pilgrimage for Hindus. It is one of 3 main pilgrimage sites related to "Krishna" circuit, namely 48 kos parikrama of Kurukshetra in Haryana state, Braj Parikarma in Mathura of Uttar Pradesh state and Dwarka Parikrama (Dwarkadish Yatra) at Dwarkadhish Temple in Gujarat state.

The flag atop the temple shows the sun and moon, which is believed to indicate that Krishna would be there till Sun and Moon exist on Earth. The flag is changed up to five times a day, but the symbol remains the same. The temple has a five-story structure built on seventy-two pillars. The temple spire is 78.3 m high. The temple is constructed of limestone which is still in pristine condition. The temple shows intricate sculptural detailing.

There are two entrances to the temple. The main entrance (north entrance) is called "Moksha Dwara" (Door to Salvation). This entrance takes one to the main market. The south entrance is called "Swarga Dwara" (Gate to Heaven). Outside this doorway are 56 steps that leads to the Gomati River. Though the origins are not clearly known, the Advaita school of Hinduism established by Sankaracharya, who created Hindu monastic institutions across India, attributes the origin of Char Dham to the seer. The four monasteries are located across the four corners of India and their attendant temples are Badrinath Temple at Badrinath in the North, Jagannath Temple at Puri in the East, Dwarakadheesh Temple at Dwarka in the West and Ramanathaswamy Temple at Rameswaram in the South. Though ideologically the temples are divided between the sects of Hinduism, namely Saivism and Vaishnavism, the Char Dham pilgrimage is an all Hindu affair. There are four abodes in Himalayas called Chota Char Dham (Chota meaning small): Badrinath, Kedarnath, Gangotri and Yamunotri - all of these lie at the foot hills of Himalayas. The name Chota was added during the mid of 20th century to differentiate the original Char Dhams. As the number of pilgrims increased to these places in modern times, it is called Himalayan Char Dham. The journey across the four cardinal points in India is considered sacred by Hindus who aspire to visit these temples once in their lifetime. Traditionally the trip starts are the eastern end from Puri, proceeding in clockwise direction in a manner typically followed for circumambulation in Hindu temples.--> The temple is open from 6.00 am to 1.00 pm and 5.00 pm to 9.30 pm. The Krishna Janmashtami festival, or Gokulashtami, the birthday of Krishna was commissioned by Vallaba (1473-1531).

According to a legend, Meera Bai, the famed Rajput princess who was also a poetess-saint and a staunch devotee of Krishna, merged with the deity at this temple.  It is one of the Sapta Puri, the seven holy cities of India.

The temple is also the location of Dvaraka Pitha, one of the four  (religious centers) established by Adi Shankaracharya (686-717) who pioneered unification of Hindu religious beliefs in the country. It is a four storied structure representing four  established by Shankaracharya in different parts of the country. There are paintings on the walls here depicting the life history of Shankaracharya while the dome has carvings of Shiva in different postures.

Structure

It is a five storied edifice built over 72 pillars (sandstone temple with 60 pillars is also mentioned). There are two important entrances to the temple, one is the main entry door which is called the Moksha Dwar (meaning "Door to Salvation") and the exit door which is known as the Swarga Dwar (meaning: "Gate to Heaven").

The main deity deified in the sanctum is of Dwarkadeesh, which is known as Trivikrama form of Vishnu and is depicted with four arms. On the chamber to the left of the main altar is the deity of Balarama, elder brother of Krishna. The chamber to the right houses the images of Pradyumna and Aniruddha, son and grandson of Krishna. In several shrines surrounding the central shrine there are idols of goddess Radha, Jambavati, Satyabhama and Lakshmi.  Shrines of Madhav Raoji (another name for Krishna), Balrama and sage Durvasa is also present in the temple. There are also two separate shrines dedicated to Radha Krishna and Devaki just in front of the central shrine of Dwarkadhish.

The flag, triangular in shape, is of  length. This flag is changed four times a day with a new one and Hindus pay a huge sum of money to hoist it by purchasing a new flag. The money received on this account is credited to the trust fund of the temple to meet the operation and maintenance expenses of the temple.

Awards
The Dwarkadhish Jagat Mandir was awarded the certificate of "World Amazing Place" on 22 March 2021 by the World Talent Organization, New Jersey, USA.

See also 
 Shri Keshavraiji Temple, Bet Dwarka
 Radha Damodar Temple, Junagadh

Bibliography

UNESCO World Cultural Heritage Site status, report on Indian Express newspaper website
Underwater remains near Dwarakadheesh temple, on website of National Institute of Oceanography

References

External links

 Official website

Hindu temples in Gujarat
Krishna temples
Char Dham temples
Divya Desams
Devbhoomi Dwarka district
Monuments of National Importance in Gujarat
Dwarka
2nd-century BC Hindu temples
15th-century Hindu temples
16th-century Hindu temples